The Washington Avenue station was a station on the demolished BMT Myrtle Avenue Line and BMT Lexington Avenue Line in Brooklyn, New York City. It was opened on December  4, 1888 and had two tracks and one island platform. The next stop to the north was Grand Avenue, and until 1950, the next stop to the north for trains destined for points on the BMT Lexington Avenue Line was Myrtle Avenue. The next stop to the south was Vanderbilt Avenue for both lines. It closed on October 4, 1969, after a fire on the structure.

References

External links

Defunct BMT Myrtle Avenue Line stations
BMT Lexington Avenue Line stations
Railway stations in the United States opened in 1888
Railway stations closed in 1969
Former elevated and subway stations in Brooklyn
1888 establishments in New York (state)
1969 disestablishments in New York (state)